Lorenzo Orsini (born 31 October 1959) is an Australian former weightlifter. He competed in the men's bantamweight event at the 1980 Summer Olympics.

References

External links
 

1959 births
Living people
Australian male weightlifters
Olympic weightlifters of Australia
Weightlifters at the 1980 Summer Olympics
Place of birth missing (living people)
Commonwealth Games medallists in weightlifting
Commonwealth Games bronze medallists for Australia
Weightlifters at the 1982 Commonwealth Games
20th-century Australian people
21st-century Australian people
Medallists at the 1982 Commonwealth Games